Children of Don Quixote is a 1966 Soviet comedy film.

Plot 
Story of an ordinary family at first glance. Large family physicians, three boys. The first   a young artist (Victor — Vladimir Korenev), second (Dima — Lev Prygunov) is growing and looking for love, for a third (Yura — Belyaninov) life   a dark cinema hall with his friend, a classmate instead of school. Middle decides to marry, Jr. fled to Africa for the liberation of the oppressed blacks, senior decides that inept and seeking a way out of a creative crisis.

The father Pyotr Bondarenko (Anatoly Papanov)   obstetrician in the hospital. His principle of life   if you can do something for the people then do it without expecting reward, not hearing spiteful critics and scoffers. Only at the end of the film the viewer realizes that all his sons were adopted. They are   children of former patients Bondarenko, who abandoned the child, and he was unable to convince them not to make this mistake, and therefore took responsibility for the fate of the children. At the final, doctor adopts a fourth boy for the same reason.

Cast
Anatoli Papanov as Pyotr Bondarenko, an obstetrician-gynecologist
Vera Orlova as Vera Bondarenko, plastic surgeon
Vladimir Korenev as Viktor Bondarenko, the eldest son, painter
Lev Prygunov as Dima Bondarenko, the middle son, a college student
Andrey Belyaninov as Yuri Bondarenko (some episodes voiced by Maria Vinogradova), the youngest son, a pupil
Natalya Fateyeva as Marina Nikolaevna, director of the theater, Victor's secret love
Nikolai Parfyonov as Athanasy Petrovich, chief accountant cinema
Natalya Sedykh as Motya, freckled girl, the Dima's bride
Natalya Zorina as Valya, a neighbor and Dima's classmate
Valentina Berezutskaya as Maria Ivanovna, nurse
Sasha Blagoveschensky as Andrey, Yuri Bondarenko friend
Zoya Vasilkova as Zoya Nikolaevna, Valya's and  Andrey's mother 
Maria Kremneva as nurse, fallen asleep on duty
Valentina Ananina as puerpera
German Kachin as Sazonov, the patient
Irina Murzaeva as old woman with a dog  
Elvira Lutsenko as fat milf
 Galina Volchek as episode

Release 
Yevgeny Karelov's film was watched by 20.6  million Soviet viewers, which is the 891th result in the history of Soviet film distribution.

References

External links 

Mosfilm films
Soviet comedy films
Russian comedy films
1966 comedy films
1966 films
Soviet teen films